Lophocoleaceae is a family of liverworts belonging to the order Jungermanniales.

Genera
Genera:

Bragginsella 
Chiloscyphus 
Clasmatocolea 
Conoscyphus 
Cryptolophocolea 
Deceptifrons 
Evansianthus 
Hepatostolonophora 
Heteroscyphus 
Lamellocolea 
Leptophyllopsis 
Leptoscyphopsis 
Leptoscyphus 
Lophocolea 
Otoscyphus 
Pachyglossa 
Perdusenia 
Pigafettoa 
Platycaulis 
Stolonivector 
Xenocephalozia

References

Jungermanniales
Liverwort families